Ghar Aaja Pardesi is an Indian television show that aired on Sahara One from 28 January 2013 to 7 June 2013, produced by Gajendra Singh.

Cast
 Ruchi Savarn as Devika 
 Vikram Gokhale as Bhavanishankar Mishra
 Mahesh Thakur as Raghav Mishra
 Sapna Pabbi / Pooja Banerjee as Rudrani
 Agastya Jain as Ajit Banarasi
 Abir Goswami / Iqbal Azad as Madhav Mishra
 Kashi Tiwari as Guddu Mishra
 Jaideep Suri
 Smita Jaykar
 Anita Kulkarni
 Niyati Joshi
 Geetanjali Mishra
 Vijay Badlani
Ankit Mohan Prateek Pandey

References

Sahara One original programming
Indian drama television series
2013 Indian television series debuts
2013 Indian television series endings